Sindhu Chandra Jamatia is an Indian politician from Tripura. He is a Member of Legislative Assembly (MLA) representing Ampinagar in the Gomati district of Tripura. 
He is affiliated with the Indigenous People's Front of Tripura (IPFT).

References 

Tripura politicians
Living people
Year of birth missing (living people)